Charles Hooker Miller (June 13, 1888 - 1966) was a Democratic Mississippi state legislator from Copiah County in the 1920s and the 1930s.

Biography 
Charles Hooker Miller was born on June 13, 1888, in Gallman, Mississippi. He represented Copiah County as a Democrat in the Mississippi House of Representatives from 1920 to 1924. He then represented Mississippi's 11th senatorial district in the Mississippi Senate from 1928 to 1932. Miller died in 1966.

References 

1888 births
1966 deaths
People from Hazlehurst, Mississippi
Democratic Party members of the Mississippi House of Representatives
Democratic Party Mississippi state senators